The Pan American Women's 7x7 Wheelchair Handball Championship was the official competition for senior national Wheelchair handball teams of Pan America.

Tournaments

Medal count

References

Women's 7x7
Parasports competitions
Wheelchair handball
Recurring sporting events established in 2014
2014 establishments in South America